Bran Mut mac Conaill (died 693) was a king of Leinster from the Uí Dúnlainge branch of the Laigin. He was the grandson of  Fáelán mac Colmáin (died 666), a previous king. He ruled from 680 to 693. 

According to the saga Bóroma ("The Cattle Tribute"), it is mentioned that the high king Fínsnechta Fledach (d. 695) of the Síl nÁedo Sláine undertook an expedition against Leinster when the Laigin refused to pay the cattle tribute. Bran Mut assembled the Leinster forces and sent Saint Moling (died 697), the abbot of Ferns, to negotiate with Fisnechta. Moling tricked Fisnechta into remitting the tribute. 

By his wife Almaith ingen Blathmac of the Cenél Loairn of the Dál Riata, he had a son Murchad mac Brain Mut (d. 727) who was a king of Leinster.

Notes

See also
List of kings of Leinster

References

 Annals of Ulster at CELT: Corpus of Electronic Texts at University College Cork
 Annals of Tigernach at CELT: Corpus of Electronic Texts at University College Cork
 Byrne, Francis John (2001), Irish Kings and High-Kings, Dublin: Four Courts Press, 
 Book of Leinster,Rig Laigin at CELT: Corpus of Electronic Texts at University College Cork
 Wiley, Dan M., The Cycles of the Kings (archived link)

External links
CELT: Corpus of Electronic Texts at University College Cork

Kings of Leinster
Kings of Uí Dúnlainge
7th-century Irish monarchs
People from County Kildare